Sir Norman Kendal CBE (13 July 1880 – 8 March 1966) was an English barrister and police officer in the London Metropolitan Police.

Kendal was born in Cheadle, Cheshire. He was educated at Rossall School and Oriel College, Oxford, where he studied Modern History, and was called to the bar by the Inner Temple in 1906, practising on the Northern Circuit. In 1914, he was commissioned into the 5th Battalion, Cheshire Regiment. He was wounded at the Battle of the Somme in 1916, and, in 1917, was attached to the Ministry of National Service as a staff officer. He was promoted Lieutenant in July 1917. In October 1918 he resigned his commission on account of ill-health caused by his wounds.

In November 1918, Kendal was appointed Chief Constable (CID) in the Metropolitan Police, and the following year, on the creation of the rank, was promoted to Deputy Assistant Commissioner (CID). In December 1928, he was appointed Assistant Commissioner "L" (Legal). In 1931 he was moved to be Assistant Commissioner "C" (Crime), holding the post until his retirement on 1 March 1945.

He was appointed Commander of the Order of the British Empire (CBE) in the 1927 Birthday Honours and knighted in 1937. He died in 1966 at his home in Chalfont St Giles, Buckinghamshire.

Footnotes

External links
Photographic portraits of Kendal in the National Portrait Gallery

1880 births
1966 deaths
People from Cheadle, Greater Manchester
People educated at Rossall School
Alumni of Oriel College, Oxford
English barristers
Members of the Inner Temple
Cheshire Regiment officers
British Army personnel of World War I
Assistant Commissioners of Police of the Metropolis
Knights Bachelor
Commanders of the Order of the British Empire
Members of the Detection Club
20th-century English lawyers